Crows Nest is a suburb on the lower North Shore of Sydney, New South Wales, Australia. It is also part of the North Sydney region, 5 kilometres north of the Sydney central business district, in the local government area of North Sydney Council.

History
Crows Nest was originally part of a  land grant made to Edward Wollstonecraft in 1821. 
The grant extended from the site of the present day Crows Nest to Wollstonecraft.  Edward Wollstonecraft built a cottage, the 'Crow's Nest' and, according to his business partner Alexander Berry, chose the name "on account of its elevated and commanding position".
Berry later built a more substantial Crow's Nest House on the estate in 1850, taking the name of the earlier cottage.
This site is now the site of North Sydney Demonstration School. The gates of Crows Nest House (added in the 1880s) still stand at the Pacific Highway entrance to the school.  Berry died at Crows Nest House on 30 November 1873.

Heritage listings 
Crows Nest has a number of heritage-listed sites, including:
 23 Albany Street: Electricity Power House

St Thomas Rest Park
St Thomas Rest Park, located in West Street, was originally the cemetery of St Thomas's Church. It was the first burial ground established on Sydney's north shore. The land for the cemetery was donated to the Anglican Parish of St Leonards in 1845 by the prominent landowner and merchant, Alexander Berry. Notable people buried there include Alexander Berry and George Barney.  Alexander Berry was buried there with his wife, in 1873, when he died at the age of 92. They are interred in an unusual, pyramid-shaped tomb with his wife's brother, Edward Wollstonecraft, former owner of Crows Nest Farm, after which the area is named. George Barney (lieutenant colonel) was born in London in 1792, and arrived in Sydney in 1835. He held a number of posts, including Commander of the Royal Engineers, and he designed Victoria Barracks. He was responsible for the completion of Fort Denison, Circular Quay, Cockatoo Dock and Darlinghurst Gaol.

The park includes the original Sexton's Cottage, which is now used as a museum of local history, and is heritage-listed.

Population
At the 2016 census, there were 4,798 residents in Crows Nest. 54.2% of residents were born in Australia.  The most common countries of birth were England 5.5%, New Zealand 3.4%, Japan 2.5%, India 2.4% and China 2.3%. 69.2% of people only spoke English at home. Other languages spoken at home included Japanese 2.9%, Mandarin 2.6% and Cantonese 2.1%.  The most common responses for religious affiliation were No Religion 39.7% and Catholic 19.9%.

38.7% of people were in the 25-39 year age group, compared to 21.1% nationally. The most common ancestries were English 23.0%, Australian 17.5%, Irish 9.8%, Scottish 6.8% and Chinese 5.9%.

Commercial area
Crows Nest is a significant commercial district which is noted for its variety of shops and restaurants. It is centred on the junction of five main roads about 1 kilometre north by northwest of the original site of Crows Nest House.

Transport
The Warringah Freeway runs along the northern border of Crows Nest and the Pacific Highway is a major road along the western border. The new Sydney Metro City & Southwest line will include a station at the north side of Crows Nest and is due to open in 2024.

Gallery

Schools and colleges
 North Sydney Girls High School (which since 1993 has occupied the site of the former Crows Nest Boys High School)
 North Sydney Boys High School
 Cammeraygal High School

Churches
 Northside Community Church
 Crows Nest Uniting Church
 Northside Baptist Church
 The Lighthouse Church
 St Michael Greek Orthodox Church

References

External links

 
Crows Nest – St Leonards – community profile

 
Suburbs of Sydney